Baraachit, also spelt Brashit, is a rural town located in the Nabatiye Governorate, in the Bint Jbeil District of southern Lebanon, ca.  southeast of Tibnine and about  from Beirut. The town has a mixed population of Shi'a and Christians.

History
The village once marked the northernmost extent of Jewish settlement upon their return from Babylonia in the 4th century BCE, and is mentioned in the 3rd century Mosaic of Rehob. By 64 BCE, the region had come under the control of the Roman empire. The area was also known since ancient times as Jabal 'Amilah, and later as Jabal 'Amil (Jabal Amel), an area that shoulders the Galilee and overlooks Palestine, with a predominant Shi'ite population.

Ottoman era
In 1596, the village ‘’Bra’sit’’ was named in the Ottoman nahiya (subdistrict) of  Tibnin  under the Liwa Safad, with a population of 45 households and 7 bachelors, all Muslim. The villagers paid taxes on  agricultural products, such as wheat, barley,  olive trees, fruit trees, goats and beehives, in addition to "occasional revenues" and a fixed sum; a total of 13,370 akçe.

In 1875, Victor Guérin visited, and found here “a cistern partly cut in the rock, and partly constructed, seems ancient.”   He found 400  Metawileh and 60 Greek Orthodox.

In 1881, British explorers, C. R. Conder and H. H. Kitchener, surveyed parts of southern Lebanon, mentioning ten villages in the Belad Besharah region, among which is listed Ber'ashit (sic): "A large village, containing about 500 Metawileh and 200 Christians. It is situated on the side of a hill, and surrounded by figs, olives, and arable cultivation. There is a good spring and several cisterns in the village."

Modern era
The current Bint Jbeil province was created in 1922 by French colonials.

Following the Israeli invasion of Lebanon in 1982, Baraachit remained part of the Israeli security zone and became the scene of recurring incidents. On 10 January 1987 an Irish soldier serving with UNIFIL was killed by Israeli tank fire near Baraachit. At the time there were 750 Irish troops with UNIFIL. A further three Irish soldiers were killed, 21 March 1989, by a landmine on the road to their outpost near Baraachit. Officers on the ground are reported as believing that the Israeli backed SLA were responsible and that UNIFIL were being deliberately targeted.
On 11 October 1990 a member of Amal was killed in a clash with the South Lebanon Army (SLA). On 23 August 1991 two SLA fighters were killed by members of Amal. The Israeli Army responded the following day with shelling which killed one civilian. Two Irish soldiers serving with UNIFIL were amongst the wounded.

IDF shelling killed a schoolboy in Baraachit on 24 January 1993.

There was a SLA outpost a few hundred yards from Baraachit and whenever it came under attack the town was shelled. The town was extensively damaged during Operation Accountability, July 1993. The head of one family who had five houses completely destroyed is reported as complaining “How many Ministers from Beirut came down here to see the damage? Rabin visits Kiryat Shimona the minute one Katuysha hits it.”

On 8 April 1996 two boys were killed by an IED concealed in a wall near Baraachit, three others wounded. Hizbollah responded by firing twenty-eight rockets at Kiryat Shimona, wounding thirteen residents. The incident is regarded as one of the triggers of Operation Grapes of Wrath later in the month which caused massive destruction across the south of Lebanon.

In 2009, there were 55 members of the Lady of the Assumption parish of the Melkite Church in the village.

Climate

Baraachit enjoys a temperate climate which is characteristic of south Lebanon: Mild rainy winters and arid summers with a few excessively warm days.

References

Bibliography

  

 (published post-mortem)

External links
Baraachit (Ber'ashit) in the Palestine Exploration Fund Map of 1878, Map 2:  IAA, Wikimedia commons
Baraachit, Localiban

Geography of Lebanon
Populated places in the Israeli security zone 1985–2000
Populated places in Bint Jbeil District